Tupac, Túpac or Tupaq (Quechua "a royal thing") is a defunct title used (similarly to Ras in the Ethiopian Empire) by the former Peruvian Inca Empire, and is used as a male name of Inca origin.

Notable people with the name include:

Music
 Tupac Mantilla (born 1978), Colombian musician and percussionist
 Tupac Amaru Shakur (1971–1996), American rapper also known by the stage names "2Pac" and "Makaveli", named after Túpac Amaru II

Leaders and politicians

Inca chiefs
 Túpac Inca Yupanqui or Tupaq Inka Yupanki (1471–1493), tenth Sapa Inka of the Incan Empire
Túpac Amaru or Tupaq Amaru (died 1572), last indigenous leader of the Inca people in Peru
Túpac Amaru II or Tupaq Amaru II (1742–1781), descendant of the Inca chief Tupac Amaru and leader of the 1780s uprising in colonial Cusco, Peru
Túpac Huallpa or Tupaq Wallpa (d. 1533), Inca ruler

Bolivia
Túpac Katari or Tupaq Katari (c. 1750–1781), leader of a rebellion of indigenous people in Bolivia

United States 

Tupac A. Hunter, (born 1973),  former member of the Michigan Senate from 2007 to 2014

See also
Túpac Amaru (disambiguation)
Túpac Amaru Revolutionary Movement, a communist guerrilla movement active in Peru from 1982 to 1997
Túpac Katari Guerrilla Army, an indigenous guerrilla movement in Bolivia which was active during the 1990s
Operation Tupac, a 1988 Pakistani covert military operation in Indian-controlled Kashmir

References

Masculine given names
Quechuan languages
South American given names